Vadim Kolesnik (born 29 April 1969) is a retired Ukrainian hammer thrower. His personal best throw is 79.62 metres, achieved in July 1994 in Dnipropetrovsk.

Achievements

External links

1969 births
Living people
Ukrainian male hammer throwers
Universiade medalists in athletics (track and field)
Universiade gold medalists for Ukraine
Universiade silver medalists for Ukraine
Medalists at the 1993 Summer Universiade
Medalists at the 1997 Summer Universiade